John Glover (died after 1418) was a cloth merchant and member of the Parliament of England for the constituency of Maldon in Essex in the parliaments of 1386, 1393, and January 1397. He was elected bailiff of Maldon nine times and also acted as an overseer of repairs to Hey bridge in 1389.

References 

Members of Parliament for Maldon
English MPs January 1397
14th-century English businesspeople
Cloth merchants
15th-century English businesspeople
English MPs 1393
English MPs 1386